Venus Express (VEX) was the first Venus exploration mission of the European Space Agency (ESA). Launched in November 2005, it arrived at Venus in April 2006 and began continuously sending back science data from its polar orbit around Venus. Equipped with seven scientific instruments, the main objective of the mission was the long term observation of the Venusian atmosphere. The observation over such long periods of time had never been done in previous missions to Venus, and was key to a better understanding of the atmospheric dynamics. ESA concluded the mission in December 2014.

History
The mission was proposed in 2001 to reuse the design of the Mars Express mission. However, some mission characteristics led to design changes: primarily in the areas of thermal control, communications and electrical power. For example, since Mars is approximately twice as far from the Sun as Venus, the radiant heating of the spacecraft is four times greater for Venus Express than Mars Express. Also, the ionizing radiation environment is harsher. On the other hand, the more intense illumination of the solar panels results in more generated photovoltaic power. The Venus Express mission also uses some spare instruments developed for the Rosetta spacecraft. The mission was proposed by a consortium led by D. Titov (Germany), E. Lellouch (France) and F. Taylor (United Kingdom).

The launch window for Venus Express was open from 26 October to 23 November 2005, with the launch initially set for 26 October 4:43 UTC. However, problems with the insulation from the Fregat upper stage led to a two-week launch delay to inspect and clear out the small insulation debris that migrated on the spacecraft. It was eventually launched by a Soyuz-FG/Fregat rocket from the Baikonur Cosmodrome in Kazakhstan on 9 November 2005 at 03:33:34 UTC into a parking Earth orbit and 1 h 36 min after launch put into its transfer orbit to Venus. A first trajectory correction maneuver was successfully performed on 11 November 2005. The burn was monitored from ESA's Control Centre, ESOC, in Darmstadt, Germany.

Seven further orbit control maneuvers, two with the main engine and five with the thrusters, were required for Venus Express to reach its final operational 24-hour orbit around Venus.

At this point the spacecraft was running on an ellipse substantially closer to the planet than during the initial orbit. The periapsis was located almost above the North pole (80° North latitude), and it took 24 hours for the spacecraft to travel around the planet.

Venus Express studied the Venusian atmosphere and clouds in detail, the plasma environment and the surface characteristics of Venus from orbit. It also made global maps of the Venusian surface temperatures. Its nominal mission was originally planned to last for 500 Earth days (approximately two Venusian sidereal days), but the mission was extended five times: first on 28 February 2007 until early May 2009; then on 4 February 2009 until 31 December 2009; and then on 7 October 2009 until 31 December 2012. On 22 November 2010, the mission was extended to 2014. On 20 June 2013, the mission was extended a final time until 2015.

On 28 November 2014, mission control lost contact with Venus Express. Intermittent contact was reestablished on 3 December 2014, though there was no control over the spacecraft, likely due to exhaustion of propellant. On 16 December 2014, ESA announced that the Venus Express mission had ended. A carrier signal was still being received from the vehicle, but no data was being transmitted. Mission manager Patrick Martin expected the spacecraft would fall below  in early January 2015, with destruction occurring in late January or early February. The spacecraft's carrier signal was last detected by ESA on 18 January 2015.

Instruments
ASPERA-4: An acronym for "Analyzer of Space Plasmas and Energetic Atoms," ASPERA-4 investigated the interaction between the solar wind and the Venusian atmosphere, determine the impact of plasma processes on the atmosphere, determine global distribution of plasma and neutral gas, study energetic neutral atoms, ions and electrons, and analyze other aspects of the near Venus environment. ASPERA-4 is a re-use of the ASPERA-3 design used on Mars Express, but adapted for the harsher near-Venus environment.

MAG: The magnetometer was designed to measure the strength of Venus's magnetic field and the direction of it as affected by the solar wind and Venus itself. It mapped the magnetosheath, magnetotail, ionosphere, and magnetic barrier in high resolution in three-dimensions, aid ASPERA-4 in the study of the interaction of the solar wind with the atmosphere of Venus, identify the boundaries between plasma regions, and carry planetary observations as well (such as the search for and characterization of Venus lightning). MAG was derived from the Rosetta lander's ROMAP instrument.

One measuring device was placed on the body of the craft. The identical second of the pair was placed the necessary distance away from the body by unfolding a 1 m long boom (carbon composite tube). Two redundant pyrotechnical cutters cut one loop of thin rope to free the power of metal springs. The driven knee lever rotated the boom perpendicularly outwards and latched it in place. Only the use of a pair of sensors together with the rotation of the probe allowed the spacecraft to resolve the small natural magnetic field beneath the disturbing fields of the probe itself. The measurements to identify the fields produced by the craft took place on the route from Earth to Venus. The lack of magnetic cleanness was due to the reuse of the Mars Express spacecraft bus, which did not carry a magnetometer. By combining the data from two-point simultaneous measurements and using software to identify and remove interference generated by Venus Express itself, it was possible to obtain results of a quality comparable to those produced by a magnetically clean craft.

VMC: The Venus Monitoring Camera is a wide-angle, multi-channel CCD. The VMC is designed for global imaging of the planet. It operated in the visible, ultraviolet, and near infrared spectral ranges, and maps surface brightness distribution searching for volcanic activity, monitoring airglow, studying the distribution of unknown ultraviolet absorbing phenomenon at the cloud-tops, and making other science observations. It was derived in part from the Mars Express High Resolution Stereo Camera (HRSC) and the Rosetta Optical, Spectroscopic and Infrared Remote Imaging System (OSIRIS). The camera included an FPGA to pre-process image data, reducing the amount transmitted to Earth. The consortium of institutions responsible for the VMC included the Max Planck Institute for Solar System Research, the Institute of Planetary Research at the German Aerospace Center and the Institute of Computer and Communication Network Engineering at Technische Universität Braunschweig. It is not to be confused with Visual Monitoring Camera mounted on Mars Express, of which it is an evolution.

PFS: The "Planetary Fourier Spectrometer" (PFS) should have operated in the infrared between the 0.9 µm and 45 µm wavelength range and was designed to perform vertical optical sounding of the Venus atmosphere. It should have performed global, long-term monitoring of the three-dimensional temperature field in the lower atmosphere (cloud level up to 100 kilometers). Furthermore, it should have searched for minor atmospheric constituents that may be present, but had not yet been detected, analyzed atmospheric aerosols, and investigated surface to atmosphere exchange processes. The design was based on a spectrometer on Mars Express, but modified for optimal performance for the Venus Express mission. However PFS failed during its deployment and no useful data was transmitted. 

SPICAV: The "SPectroscopy for Investigation of Characteristics of the Atmosphere of Venus" (SPICAV) is an imaging spectrometer that was used for analyzing radiation in the infrared and ultraviolet wavelengths. It was derived from the SPICAM instrument flown on Mars Express. However, SPICAV had an additional channel known as SOIR (Solar Occultation at Infrared) that was used to observe the Sun through Venus's atmosphere in the infrared.

VIRTIS: The "Visible and Infrared Thermal Imaging Spectrometer" (VIRTIS) was an imaging spectrometer that observed in the near-ultraviolet, visible, and infrared parts of the electromagnetic spectrum. It analyzed all layers of the atmosphere, surface temperature and surface/atmosphere interaction phenomena.

VeRa: Venus Radio Science was a radio sounding experiment that transmitted radio waves from the spacecraft and passed them through the atmosphere or reflected them off the surface. These radio waves were received by a ground station on Earth for analysis of the ionosphere, atmosphere and surface of Venus. It was derived from the Radio Science Investigation instrument flown on Rosetta.

Science

Climate of Venus

Starting out in the early planetary system with similar sizes and chemical compositions, the histories of Venus and Earth have diverged in spectacular fashion. It is hoped that the Venus Express mission data that was obtained can contribute not only to an in-depth understanding of how the Venusian atmosphere is structured, but also to an understanding of the changes that led to the current greenhouse atmospheric conditions. Such an understanding may contribute to the study of climate change on Earth.

Search for life on Earth
Venus Express was also used to observe signs of life on Earth from Venus orbit. In images acquired by the probe, Earth was less than one pixel in size, which mimics observations of Earth-sized planets in other planetary systems. These observations were then used to develop methods for habitability studies of exoplanets.

Timeline of the mission

3 August 2005: Venus Express completed its final phase of testing at Astrium Intespace facility in Toulouse, France.
7 August 2005: Venus Express arrived at the airport of the Baikonur Cosmodrome.
16 August 2005: First flight verification test completed.
22 August 2005: Integrated System Test-3.
30 August 2005: Last major system test successfully started.
5 September 2005: Electrical testing successful.
21 September 2005: FRR (Fuelling Readiness Review) Ongoing.
12 October 2005: Mating to the Fregat upper stage completed.
21 October 2005: Contamination detected inside the fairing – launch on hold.
5 November 2005: Arrival at launch pad.
9 November 2005: Launch from Baikonur Cosmodrome at 03:33:34 UTC.
11 November 2005: First trajectory correction maneuver successfully performed.
17 February 2006: The main engine is fired successfully in a dress rehearsal for the arrival maneuver.
24 February 2006: Second trajectory correction maneuver successfully performed.
29 March 2006: Third trajectory correction maneuver successfully performed – on target for 11 April orbit insertion.
7 April 2006: Command stack for orbit insertion maneuver is loaded on the spacecraft.
11 April 2006: The Venus Orbit Insertion (VOI) is completed successfully, according to the following timeline:

{| class="wikitable"
|-
!Event
!Spacecraft event time (UTC)
!Ground receive time (UTC)
|-
| Liquid Settling Phase start || 07:07:56 || 07:14:41
|-
| VOI main engine start || 07:10:29 || 07:17:14
|-
| periapsis passage || 07:36:35 ||
|-
| eclipse start || 07:37:46 ||
|-
| occultation start || 07:38:30 || 07:45:15
|-
| occultation end || 07:48:29 || 07:55:14
|-
| eclipse end || 07:55:11 ||
|-
| VOI burn end || 08:00:42 || 08:07:28
|}

Period of this initial orbit is nine days.
13 April 2006: First images of Venus from Venus Express released.
20 April 2006: Apoapsis Lowering Manoeuvre #1 performed. Orbital period is now 40 hours.
23 April 2006: Apoapsis Lowering Manoeuvre #2 performed. Orbital period is now approx 25 hours 43 minutes.
26 April 2006: Apoapsis Lowering Manoeuvre #3 is slight fix to previous ALM.
7 May 2006: Venus Express entered its target orbit at apoapsis at 13:31 UTC
14 December 2006: First temperature map of the southern hemisphere.
27 February 2007: ESA agrees to fund mission extension until May 2009.
19 September 2007: End of the nominal mission (500 Earth days) – Start of mission extension.
27 November 2007: A series of papers was published in Nature giving the initial findings. It finds evidence for past oceans. It confirms the presence of lightning on Venus and that it is more common on Venus than it is on Earth. It also reports the discovery that a huge double atmospheric vortex exists at the south pole of the planet.
20 May 2008: The detection by the VIRTIS instrument of hydroxyl (OH) in the atmosphere of Venus is reported in the May 2008 issue of Astronomy & Astrophysics.
4 February 2009: ESA agrees to fund mission extension until 31 December 2009.
7 October 2009: ESA agrees to fund the mission through 31 December 2012.
 23 November 2010: ESA agrees to fund the mission through 31 December 2014.
 25 August 2011: It is reported that a layer of ozone exists in the upper atmosphere of Venus.
 1 October 2012: It is reported that a cold layer where dry ice may precipate exists in the atmosphere of Venus.
 18 June—11 July 2014: Performs successful aerobraking experiment. Multiple passes at 131 to 135 km altitude.
 28 November 2014: Mission control loses contact with Venus Express.
 3 December 2014: Intermittent contact established, spacecraft determined to likely be out of propellant.
 16 December 2014: ESA declares the Venus Express mission over.
 18 January 2015: Last detection of the spacecraft's X-band carrier signal.

See also

 Uncrewed space mission
 List of planetary probes
 List of missions to Venus
 List of uncrewed spacecraft by program
 Space exploration
 Space telescope
 Space probe
 Timeline of artificial satellites and space probes
 Timeline of planetary exploration

References

Further reading

External links

 Venus Express mission page by the European Space Agency
 Venus Express mission page by ESA Spacecraft Operations
 Venus Express profile by NASA's Solar System Exploration

Space probes launched in 2005
European Space Agency space probes
Embedded systems
Missions to Venus
Orbiters (space probe)
Spacecraft launched by Soyuz-FG rockets